

Sovereign states

A

 Aachen – Free Imperial City of Aachen 

 Andorra – Principality of Andorra 

 Anhalt-Bernburg – Principality of Anhalt-Bernburg 

 Anhalt-Bernburg-Schaumburg-Hoym – Principality of Anhalt-Bernburg-Schaumburg-Hoym 

 Anhalt-Dessau – Principality of Anhalt-Dessau 

 Anhalt-Köthen – Principality of Anhalt-Köthen 

 Anhalt-Zerbst – Principality of Anhalt-Zerbst 

 Anholt – County of Anholt 

 Augsburg – Prince-Bishopric of Augsburg 

 Austria – Archduchy of Austria

B

Baden – Margraviate of Baden

 Basel – Prince-Bishopric of Basel 

 Brixen – Prince-Bishopric of Brixen

C

 Cleves – Duchy of Cleves 

China – Great Qing

 Cologne – Electorate of Cologne 

Comancheria – Nʉmʉnʉʉ Sookobitʉ

D

 Dutch Republic – Republic of the Seven United Netherlands

F

 – Kingdom of France 

 Frankfurt – Free Imperial City of Frankfurt

G

 Georgia – Kingdom of Kartli-Kakheti 

 Genoa – Republic of Genoa

I

 Ireland – Kingdom of Ireland

K

 Korea – Kingdom of Great Joseon

L

 Liège – Prince-Bishopric of Liège 

 Lucca – Most Serene Republic of Lucca 

 Lübeck – Free Imperial City of Lübeck

M

 Mainz – Electorate of Mainz 

 Massa and Carrara – Duchy of Massa and Carrara 

 Mecklenburg-Schwerin – Duchy of Mecklenburg-Schwerin 

 Mecklenburg-Strelitz – Duchy of Mecklenburg-Strelitz 

 Memmingen – Free Imperial City of Memmingen 

 Moldavia – Principality of Moldavia 

 Morocco – Sultanate of Morocco 

 Münster – Prince-Bishopric of Münster

N

 Nepal – Kingdom of Nepal

O

 Oldenburg – Duchy of Oldenburg 

 Osnabrück – Prince-Bishopric of Osnabrück

P

 Paderborn – Prince-Bishopric of Paderborn 

 Papal States – State of the Church 

 Passau – Prince-Bishopric of Passau 

 Persia 

 Piombino – Principality of Piombino 

 Portugal – Kingdom of Portugal 

 Prussia – Kingdom of Prussia

R

 Regensburg – Prince-Bishopric of Regensburg 

 Russia – Russian Empire

S

 Salzburg – Prince-Archbishopric of Salzburg 

 – Most Serene Republic of San Marino 

 Sardinia – Kingdom of Sardinia 

 Saxony – Electorate of Saxony 

 Siak Sri Indrapura – Sultanate of Siak Sri Indrapura 

 →  Spain – Kingdom of Spain

T

 Thonburi – Kingdom of Thonburi (until 1782) 

 Trent – Prince-Bishopric of Trent 

 Trier – Electorate of Trier

U

 Ulm – Free Imperial City of Ulm 

United States (to March 1, 1781)
The United States of America (from March 1, 1781 to March 4, 1789)
United States of America (from March 4, 1789)

V

 – Most Serene Republic of Venice

W

 Württemberg – Duchy of Württemberg 

 Würzburg – Prince-Bishopric of Würzburg

Non-sovereign territories

Denmark
 Danish West Indies

Dutch East India Company
 Dutch Cape Colony – Cape Colony

Great Britain
 British America – British America and the British West Indies (until September 3, 1783)

Portugal
 Brazil – State of Brazil

Spain
 New Spain – Viceroyalty of New Spain 
 →  New Granada – Viceroyalty of New Granada 
 →  Peru – Viceroyalty of Peru 
 →  Río de la Plata – Viceroyalty of the Río de la Plata

References